Walter John Zirinsky (August 1, 1920 – November 30, 2001) was an American football halfback who was a member of the Cleveland Rams team that won the 1945 NFL Championship.

Biography

Early years
Walter John Zirinsky, known by the nickname "Walt," was born August 1, 1920 in Northampton, Pennsylvania. He was the son of Cyril Zirinsky and the former Mary Flisak.

Zirinsky attended Northampton Area High School, taking up the sport of football and excelled in it. Following his graduation from high school Zirinsky played college football at Lafayette College in Easton, Pennsylvania, where he was a halfback who also handled placekicking duties for the team. He was a star of the team from the 1940 season, scoring three touchdowns in a 46-0 route of arch-rival Lehigh that capped off an unbeaten year.

NFL career
Zirinsky was drafted by the Cleveland Rams of the National Football League in the 1942 NFL draft, selected in the 12th round, the league's 102nd pick overall. However, Zirinsky enlisted in the Naval Air Corps during World War II, where he flew blimps in the South Pacific. During the war years, he played football for a military service football team. He was discharged on October 8, 1945 as a Lieutenant.

He was discharged in time to play in the 1945 NFL season, signing with the Rams, the team which held his draft rights. Zirinsky played in five of the ten games played by the Rams during the 1945 season, a campaign which culminated with the team's 15-14 victory over the Washington Redskins in the 1945 NFL Championship Game. On the year he only carried the ball three times, gaining just three yards.

Zirinsky signed a second NFL contract in March 1946 with Rams General Manager Chile Walsh to play for the team during their inaugural season in Los Angeles. This was not to be, however, as in April the Rams traded the Pennsylvania native Zirinsky to the NFL's Philadelphia Eagles for fullback and punter Jack Banta, a native Californian who was a former collegiate star at USC.

Zirinsky never played for the Eagles, however, and his NFL career came to an end with just the three carries for the Rams and participation on an NFL championship team to his credit.

Life after football
Zirinsky was married to the former Mary Laubach, with whom he had one son.

Following his retirement from the NFL, Zirinsky worked as a department chief for Western Electric in Allentown, Pennsylvania, where he worked for 37 years.

Death and legacy
Walt Zirinsky died November 30, 2001, in Catasauqua, Pennsylvania. He was 81 years old at the time of his death. His family asked for donations to the American Cancer Society in Zirinsky's memory.

Footnotes

External links
Walt Zirinsky statistics at Just Sports Stats

1920 births
2001 deaths
American football halfbacks
American football defensive backs
Cleveland Rams players
Lafayette Leopards football players
Military personnel from Pennsylvania
Northampton Area High School alumni
Players of American football from Pennsylvania
Sportspeople from Northampton County, Pennsylvania
United States Navy officers
United States Navy personnel of World War II